Brian Daly is an Irish news journalist who previously worked for TV3 News. He spent also worked as Ireland Correspondent for Sky News in Dublin. Daly was one of the Sky News Ireland's two anchors for its twice-weeknightly programmes alongside colleague Ray Kennedy, following the departure of previous Sky News Ireland anchor Gráinne Seoige.

Daly joined Sky News from Irish channel TV3, where he had worked since the channel's launch in 1998 and anchored the breakfast show Ireland AM. Prior to presenting on TV3, he worked on different radio stations within the Republic of Ireland.

He rejoined TV3 in 2008 after four years with Sky.

References

External links
 Profile on TV3
 Profile on Sky News

Year of birth missing (living people)
Living people
Sky News newsreaders and journalists
Virgin Media News newsreaders and journalists